Gaertneriomyces is a genus of fungi belonging to the family Spizellomycetaceae.

The species of this genus are found in Southeastern Asia and Australia.

Species:

Gaertneriomyces californicus 
Gaertneriomyces palmatus 
Gaertneriomyces semiglobifer 
Gaertneriomyces spectabile 
Gaertneriomyces spectabilis

References

Chytridiomycota
Chytridiomycota genera